The Speedway Champions Cup was an annual motorcycle speedway competition that took place between 1986 and 1993, featuring the national champions of the sixteen participating nations. It was discontinued with the introduction of the Speedway Grand Prix in 1995.

The 1990 championship was held at Lonigo and the winner was Hans Nielsen of Denmark.

Results
April 29, 1990
 Lonigo

References

Speedway Champions Cup
Champions Cup
Speedway Champions Cup